Renau may refer to:

People
 Josep Renau (1907–1982), Spanish artist and communist revolutionary
 Maria Dolors Renau (1936–2019), Spanish politician

Places
 Renau, Tarragona, Spain

Other
 Renau (river), Germany